Johnny DeFazio (November 30, 1940  February 26, 2021) was an American professional wrestler from Pittsburgh, Pennsylvania.

Professional wrestling career
DeFazio was a fan favorite and was popular in the 1960s and 1970s. He wrestled for the old Studio Wrestling program on WIIC-TV in Pittsburgh, hosted by Bill Cardille.  He was a four-time winner of the World Wide Wrestling Federation's Junior Heavyweight Championship. He also was active in the United Steelworkers of America (he was the union's director in Pennsylvania) and was an Allegheny County councilman from 1999 until 2019.

Death
Johnny DeFazio died on February 26, 2021.

Championships 

 World Wide Wrestling Federation
 WWWF International Tag Team Championship (1 time) - with Geeto Mongol
 WWWF Junior Heavyweight Championship (4 times)

References

External links 
 Johnny DeFazio, County Council At-Large

1940 births
2021 deaths
American male professional wrestlers
American people of Italian descent
Professional wrestlers from Pennsylvania
United Steelworkers people
Sportspeople from Pittsburgh
20th-century professional wrestlers